

This is a list of National Register of Historic Places listings in Woonsocket, Rhode Island.

Included in the list are all properties and districts on the National Register of Historic Places in the city of Woonsocket, Rhode Island, United States. Woonsocket is home to 43 of the more than 400 properties and districts listed in Providence County. Properties and districts located in the county's other municipalities are listed separately. One Woonsocket listing, 
the Blackstone Canal, extends into other parts of Providence County, and appears on multiple lists.  There is also one former listing.

|}

Former listing

|}

See also

National Register of Historic Places listings in Providence County, Rhode Island
List of National Historic Landmarks in Rhode Island

References

N
.N
.
Woonsocket
Woonsocket, Rhode Island